Two ships of the Indian Navy have been named INS Vagir:

  was a  launched in 1972 and decommissioned in 2001
  is a  launched in 2020

Indian Navy ship names